The UNTV Cup Season 6 was the 2017–2018 season of the annual charity basketball league in the Philippines, UNTV Cup. The tournament was organized by UNTV under the UNTV-37 Foundation, Inc., thru its chairman and chief executive officer of BMPI-UNTV, Kuya Daniel Razon, more popularly known as Mr. Public Service.

The season officially opened on September 12, 2017 at the Smart Araneta Coliseum in Quezon City, with fourteen teams vying for the championship title. Regular games were held at the Pasig City Sports Center in Pasig with a live telecast on the UNTV Public Service channel every Sunday afternoon.

The best-of-three finals series was held on March 4 and 12, 2018, at the Pasig City Sports Center in Pasig and Smart Araneta Coliseum in Quezon City, respectively. The championship is between two-time runner-up Malacañan-PSC Kamao and first time finalist Senate Defenders. Senate won the series against Malacañang-PSC in two games, 2–0, to get their first title and donate ₱4 million to their chosen charity. After the tournament, the Office of the Senate proudly sponsored a resolution congratulating the Senate Defenders for bringing home the championship title.

A total of 9.6 million pesos tax-free was given to the teams' chosen beneficiaries, with the champion team Senate Defenders taking home a trophy and 500 thousand pesos, and 4 million pesos given to their chosen charity institution.

During the season, the league got its third AnakTV award for being a child-friendly basketball tournament.

From Season 1 to Season 6, including the three off season tournaments, UNTV Cup has given a total of ₱35 million to the beneficiaries of the participating teams.

Teams
There are 14 squads who vied for the championship title of the season, including 10 returning teams led by Season 5 champions PNP Responders.

New Teams
Four new teams were introduced this season.
 Commission on Audit (COA) Enablers
 Department of Agriculture (DA) Food Masters
 Department of Health (DOH) Health Achievers
 Philippine Drug Enforcement Agency (PDEA) Drug Busters

Defunct Teams
Three teams backed out of the competition.
 Bureau of Customs (BOC) Transformers
 House of Representatives (HOR) Solons
 Metropolitan Manila Development Authority (MMDA) Black Wolves

Group A

Group B

Elimination round

The elimination round began on September 12, 2017. On the first round of eliminations, the tournament is divided into two groups of seven teams. The schedule follows a single round robin format in which all teams will face each other in their group once, for a total of 6 games per team. 
After the first round, the bottom three teams from each group are eliminated, while the remaining eight teams advance to the second round of elimination. Win loss records from the first round will carry over to the second round, and each team will play one game against the four teams from the opposite group. 
After the second round, the bottom two teams are eliminated. The top 2 teams will get outright semifinals spots, while the remaining 4 teams battle it out on the quarterfinals, with #3 team facing #6, and #4 seed playing against #5.

First round

Group A

Group B

Second round

Playoffs
There are six teams that qualified for the playoffs. The top two teams, (#1) AFP Cavaliers and (#2) NHA Builders, already advance to the semifinals, holding also the twice-to-beat advantage. The remaining four teams will fight for the final two semifinal slots. (#3) Malacañan-PSC Kamao and (#4) Senate Defenders will have a twice-to-beat advantage on the quarterfinals against (#6) Judiciary Magis and (#5) PNP Responders, respectively.

Quarterfinals
The #4 team Senate Defenders have a twice-to-beat advantage against defending champion and #5 ranked PNP Responders, while two-time champion and #6 seed Judiciary Magis needs to win two games versus two-time finalists and #3 team  Malacañan-PSC Kamao.

Both higher seeded teams won their respective series. Senate dethrone PNP in one game, 74–66, while Malacañan-PSC beat Judiciary, 79–64, to advance to the semifinals. The Defenders face top team AFP Cavaliers, and the Kamao sets a date with #2 seed NHA Builders.

(4) Senate Defenders vs. (5) PNP Responders

(3) Malacañan-PSC Kamao vs. (6) Judiciary Magis

Semifinals
The AFP Cavaliers and NHA Builders have a twice-to-beat advantage in the semifinals after being the top 2 teams at the end of the elimination round. Quarterfinals winners Malacañan-PSC Kamao and Senate Defenders would need to win twice to enter the finals.

Malacañan-PSC and Senate did the improbable by beating NHA and AFP, respectively, in two straight games.

(2) NHA Builders vs. (3) Malacañan-PSC Kamao

(1) AFP Cavaliers vs. (4) Senate Defenders

Battle for Third Place: (1) AFP Cavaliers vs. (2) NHA Builders
The battle for third place was between the top two seeds AFP Cavaliers and NHA Builders, after they lost their semifinals series on separate opponents with a twice-to-beat advantage. AFP won the game, 85–84, and gets ₱1,000,000 for their chosen beneficiary and ₱200,000 for their team as third placer. Despite the loss, NHA received ₱500,000 for charity and ₱100,000 for the team as fourth placer.

UNTV Cup Finals: (3) Malacañan-PSC Kamao vs. (4) Senate Defenders
The best-of-three finals series was held on March 4 and 12, 2018, at the Pasig City Sports Center in Pasig and Smart Araneta Coliseum in Quezon City, respectively. The championship is between two-time runner-up Malacañan-PSC Kamao and first time finalist Senate Defenders. Both the semifinals underdogs won their separate series despite the twice-to-win disadvantage. Senate won the finals series against Malacañang-PSC, 2–0, to get their first title and donate ₱4 million to their chosen charity. After the tournament, the Office of the Senate proudly sponsored a resolution congratulating the Senate Defenders for bringing home the championship title.

Winners and Beneficiaries
A total of 9.6 million pesos tax-free was given to the teams' chosen beneficiaries, with the champion team Senate Defenders taking home a trophy and 500 thousand pesos, and 4 million pesos given to their chosen charity institution. The runner-up team Malacañang-PSC Kamao received 300 thousand pesos, and 2 million pesos for their beneficiary. Two hundred thousand pesos was given to the third place team AFP Cavaliers, and 1 million pesos for their chosen beneficiary. One hundred thousand pesos was given to the fourth-place finishers NHA Builders, and five hundred thousand pesos for their chosen charity. The other participating teams got 100 thousand pesos for their beneficiary.

Individual awards

Season awards

The season's individual awards were given during the halftime break of Game 2 of the Finals, on March 12, 2018 at the Smart Araneta Coliseum.

Scoring Champion: Marlon Basco (PDEA Drug Busters)
Step Up Player of the Year: Julius Caesar Rabino (Judiciary Magis)
Defensive Player of the Year: Jeffry Sanders (Senate Defenders)
First Five:
 Antonio Lustestica Jr. (NHA Builders)
 Eric Dela Cuesta (Malacañang-PSC Kamao)
 Jeffry Sanders (Senate Defenders)
 James Patrick Abugan (GSIS Furies)
 Marlon Basco (PDEA Drug Busters)
Most Valuable Player:
Season MVP: Antonio Lustestica Jr. (NHA Builders)
Finals MVP: Jeffry Sanders (Senate Defenders)

Top Players of the Season
The following players have excelled in their respective categories.

Players of the Week
The following players were named the Players of the Week.

Overall standings

Elimination round

Playoffs

UNTV Cup Segments

Heart of a Champion 
The Heart of a Champion segment features UNTV Cup players and their lives off the court as public servants.

Top Plays
The following segment features the top plays of the week and elimination round.

Player and Fan Interviews
UNTV Cup players and fans share their thoughts in interviews.

See also 
 UNTV Cup
 UNTV Public Service

References

External links 
 UNTVweb.com

Members Church of God International
2017 Philippine television series debuts
2017 in Philippine sport
2018 in Philippine sport
UNTV Cup
UNTV (Philippines) original programming
2017–18 in Philippine basketball
2017–18 in Philippine basketball leagues